The 1988 Colorado Buffaloes football team represented the University of Colorado at Boulder in the Big Eight Conference during the 1988 NCAA Division I-A football season. Led by seventh-year head coach Bill McCartney, Colorado finished the regular season at 8–3 (4–3 in Big 8, fourth), and played their home games on campus at Folsom Field in Boulder, Colorado.

The eight wins were the most by the Buffaloes in twelve years, with narrow losses to ninth-ranked Oklahoma and #7 Nebraska.

Ranked twentieth in the coaches' poll, Colorado was invited to the Freedom Bowl in Anaheim, California, but was upset 17–20 by BYU of the Western Athletic Conference (WAC), led by sophomore quarterback Ty Detmer.

Schedule

Personnel

Season summary

Fresno State

at Iowa

Oregon State

at Colorado State

Oklahoma State

at Kansas

Oklahoma

Iowa State

at Missouri

at Nebraska

Kansas State

Freedom Bowl (vs BYU)

References

External links
Sports-Reference – 1988 Colorado Buffaloes

Colorado
Colorado Buffaloes football seasons
Colorado Buffaloes football